WYYW-CD, virtual and UHF digital channel 15, is a low-powered, Class A Telemundo-affiliated television station licensed to Evansville, Indiana, United States.

Until 2009, WYYW-CD was co-owned by the Evansville Low Power Partnership and Comcorp, which owns Evansville CBS affiliate WEVV-TV.

History

On May 19, 2009, the then-WTSN-LP ceased broadcasting My44 and MyNetworkTV programming, and on June 1, the station flash cut to digital as WTSN-LD and changed its affiliation to America One. WEVV now carries MyNetworkTV as a secondary affiliate on its digital signal, on digital channel 44.2.

In August 2010, both WTSN-LD and WYYW-LP were granted Class A status by the Federal Communications Commission. The Class A designation protects them from being relocated to another channel by a full-power station.

In November 2011, WTSN-CD and WYYW-LP became affiliates of the classic programming network MeTV. This lasted until February 25, 2014, when WYYW took on the Heartland affiliation. The station also added a second digital subchannel to carry The Family Channel on 15.2 on that same date. MeTV was still seen on sister station WTSN-CD until October 23. Then on January 17, 2015, WTSN-CD did repeats of Heartland's E/I programming on Saturday mornings, replacing its Heroes & Icons affiliation at that time during the weekend with these programs because of its religious programming on Sunday mornings until the affiliation with WYYW-CD ended. Then, in July of that year, WYYW-CD started to affiliate with the Spanish language network Telemundo with Retro TV airing on 15.3.

Digital channels
The station's digital signal is multiplexed:

References

External links

YYW-CD
Telemundo network affiliates
Spanish-language television stations in Indiana
Television channels and stations established in 1993
1993 establishments in Indiana
Retro TV affiliates
Low-power television stations in the United States